Karol Jokl (29 August 1945 – 28 October 1996) was a Slovak football player and manager. He played for ŠK Slovan Bratislava and Czechoslovakia.

Between 1963 and 1975 he played in the Czechoslovak First League for ŠK Slovan Bratislava, scoring a total of 69 goals in 245 matches. Among his greatest honours is winning the 1968–69 European Cup Winners' Cup, as well as two league titles and two Czechoslovak Cups.

Jokl made his debut for the national team of Czechoslovakia at the age of 18, going on to score 11 goals in 27 matches for his country. He played in all three of Czechoslovakia's matches at the 1970 FIFA World Cup.

Honours
Slovan Bratislava
UEFA Cup Winners' Cup (1): 1968-69
Czechoslovak First League (3): 1969-70, 1973-74, 1974-75 
Czechoslovak Cup (2): 1968, 1974
Slovak Cup (3): 1970, 1972, 1974

Czechoslovakia
1970 FIFA World Cup: Group Stage

References 

 

1945 births
1996 deaths
1970 FIFA World Cup players
Slovak footballers
Czechoslovak footballers
Czechoslovakia international footballers
ŠK Slovan Bratislava players
ŠK Slovan Bratislava managers
People from Partizánske
Sportspeople from the Trenčín Region
Association football midfielders
Slovak football managers
FC Baník Prievidza players